The First International Tramways and Light Railways Exhibition was held in the Royal Agricultural Hall, Islington, London from 30 June 1900 – 11 July 1900.

The International Tramways and Light Railways Exhibition was promoted by "The Tramway and Railway World".

The exhibitors included:
The Electric Tramways Equipment Company of Birmingham
The Ohio Brass Company
British Westinghouse Electric, which ran a full-sized double-decked car on track in the exhibition hall to demonstrate its third rail and conduit system.
British Mannesman Tube Company, Showed traction, arc and trolley poles
British Thomson-Houston
Brush Electrical Engineering Company
Brill Company
Robert W. Blackwell and Company a large display of items related to electrically equipped vehicles and lines including poles, trolleys, insulators, trucks, conduits, fittings and an electric car to carry 53 passengers. 
Dick, Kerr & Co.
Electric Railway and Tramway Carriage Works
English Electric Manufacturing Company

Mr. O'Brien won the competition for reversible tramway seats.

References

1900 in the United Kingdom
Tram transport in the United Kingdom
Trade fairs in the United Kingdom
Light rail